NegevZoo (Zoological Garden of Beersheba) was a desert zoo  near the west entrance of Beersheba, Israel.

The zoo's area is 50 dunams (1 hectare or 2.5 acres). It has a collection of mammalians, birds and reptiles of which the ungulates, turtles, snakes and lizards are especially notable.

History
The zoo was established in 1954 as a petting zoo of the nearby school. Little by little it got support from the city of Beersheba, the Israeli Ministry of Education, the Housing and Construction Minister of Israel and private contributors, it moved from place to place in the town, and finally was made a formal zoo.

In 1983 Prof. R. Yagil started a funding Campaign to fund a new location for the Zoo, in 1985 the Zoo had moved to the location where Ma'abarat Hazerim had been previously located, and was officially opened in 1985. The transfer was to a 1000 sq meter area. Most of the work was done by volunteers.

In 1991 with the establishment of Neve Ze'ev the zoo was moved  to Kiryat Meir Batz and reopened in 1996.

In 2011 the zoo had moved to be operated by the Be'er Sheva cityhall, and since then it is operated by the Kivunim corporation which is owned by the Be'er sheva cityhall.

In 2017, Negev zoo was expected to receive a pair of lions Three white lions had arrived from the Susto zoo in Hungary (one male and two females). 

In 2022, the zoo closed.

See also
Wildlife of Israel

References

Zoos in Israel
Buildings and structures in Beersheba
Tourist attractions in Southern District (Israel)
Zoos established in 1954
1954 establishments in Israel